"WWE WHC" can refer to one of two professional wrestling championships:

 World Heavyweight Championship (WWE), a world heavyweight championship in WWE from 2002 until 2013
 WWE World Heavyweight Championship, the name given to the former WWE Championship after it was unified with the above championship in 2013